Regius Professor of Physic may refer to:
Regius Professor of Physic (Cambridge), a professorship at the University of Cambridge
Regius Professor of Physic (Dublin), a professorship at the University of Dublin, Trinity College
Regius Professor of Medicine (Oxford) (formerly the Regius Professor of Physic), a professorship at the University of Oxford

See also
Regius Professor of Medicine (disambiguation)